Two-time defending champion Pete Sampras defeated Andre Agassi in the final, 6–3, 6–4, 7–5 to win the gentlemen's singles tennis title at the 1999 Wimbledon Championships. With his sixth Wimbledon crown, Sampras broke Björn Borg's Open Era record of five Wimbledon men's singles titles and equalled Roy Emerson's record of twelve men's singles major titles overall. Sampras's victory over Agassi in the final is often cited as one of the greatest performances in a Wimbledon final. However, despite his victory, Sampras lost the world No. 1 ranking to Agassi, who had recently won the French Open and was attempting to complete the Channel Slam.

This tournament is also notable as being the last major in which former world No. 1 Boris Becker competed, and the first Wimbledon appearances for future champions Lleyton Hewitt and Roger Federer.

Seeds

  Pete Sampras (champion)
  Pat Rafter (semifinals)
  Yevgeny Kafelnikov (third round, retired due to a hamstring injury)
  Andre Agassi (final)
  Richard Krajicek (third round)
  Tim Henman (semifinals)
  Mark Philippoussis (quarterfinals, retired due to a left knee injury)
  Todd Martin (quarterfinals)
  Greg Rusedski (fourth round)
  Goran Ivanišević (fourth round)
  Gustavo Kuerten (quarterfinals)
  Carlos Moyá (second round)
  Karol Kučera (fourth round)
  Tommy Haas (third round)
  Nicolas Kiefer (second round)
  Félix Mantilla (second round)

Qualifying

Draw

Finals

Top half

Section 1

Section 2

Section 3

Section 4

Bottom half

Section 5

Section 6

Section 7

Section 8

References

External links

 1999 Wimbledon Championships – Men's draws and results at the International Tennis Federation

Men's Singles
Wimbledon Championship by year – Men's singles